Adoxotoma is a genus of South Pacific jumping spiders that was first described by Eugène Louis Simon in 1909.

Species
 it contains ten species, found only in New Zealand and Australia:
Adoxotoma bargo Zabka, 2001 – Australia (New South Wales)
Adoxotoma chionopogon Simon, 1909 – Australia (Western Australia)
Adoxotoma embolica Gardzińska & Zabka, 2010 – Australia (Western Australia)
Adoxotoma forsteri Zabka, 2004 – New Zealand
Adoxotoma hannae Zabka, 2001 – Australia (New South Wales)
Adoxotoma justyniae Zabka, 2001 – Australia (New South Wales)
Adoxotoma nigroolivacea Simon, 1909 (type) – Australia (Western Australia)
Adoxotoma nitida Gardzińska & Zabka, 2010 – Australia (Western Australia)
Adoxotoma nodosa (L. Koch, 1879) – Australia (Queensland)
Adoxotoma sexmaculata Gardzińska & Zabka, 2010 – Australia (Western Australia)

References

Salticidae
Salticidae genera
Spiders of Australia